Violet A Akurut also known as Akurut Violet Adome (born 25 August 1976) is a Ugandan politician and teacher by profession. She is the district woman representative of Katakwi District in the 10th Parliament of Uganda. She is a member of the National Resistance Movement political party. She was the aspiring Woman Member of Parliament 2021-2026, of Katakwi under NRM political party.

Education 
In 1989, she completed her Primary Leaving Examination from Madera Girls Primary School and later joined Kangole Girls Senior Secondary School for her Uganda Certificate of Education in 1993. In 1996, she finished her  Uganda Advanced Certificate of Education from Tororo Girls School. In 1999, she obtained a Certificate in Project Planning and Management from Uganda Management Institute. In 2003, she was awarded a Bachelors Degree in Education from Makerere University. She holds Post Graduate Diploma in Resource Mobilization and Management from Uganda Management Institute which she got in 2010. She later went back to get a Master of Diplomacy and International Studies from Uganda Martyrs University in 2016.

Career life before politics 
From 2012-2016, she worked as the Commissioner at Uganda Human Rights Commission. In 2012, she was the Co-Ordinator at Women of Uganda Network. Between 2010-2011, she was employed as the Programme Manager at Transform Uganda. From 2009-2010, she was the Programme Officer at ANPPCAN. She worked as the Programme Co-Ordinator at World Vision International in 2007-2008. In 2002-2005, she worked at Education Department, Soroti Catholic Diocese as the Programme Manager. She was the Gender Officer at Katakwi District Local Government in the year 2000-2001. From 2012 to date, she has served as the Chairperson, Advisory Board at Katakwi Grassroots Women Development Initiative. Also from 2015 to date, she  has worked as the Executive Treasurer at Uganda National AIDS Services Organization.

Political life 
From 2016 to date, she served as the  Member of Parliament at the Parliament of Uganda. While at the Parliament of Uganda, she was the member on the Committee on  HIV/AIDS & Related Disease, and Committee on Education and Sports.

Personal life 
She is married.

See also 

 List of members of the tenth Parliament of Uganda
 Katakwi District
 Parliament of Uganda
 National Resistance Movement
 Member of Parliament

References

External links 

 Website of the Parliament of Uganda
 Violet Akurut on Twitter

Living people
1976 births
People from Katakwi District
National Resistance Movement politicians
Members of the Parliament of Uganda
Women members of the Parliament of Uganda